Leimbach is a small river of Hesse, Germany.  It is a right tributary of the Wehre in Reichensachsen.

See also
List of rivers of Hesse

Rivers of Hesse
Rivers of Germany